Wilbert Walker (born 7 January 1985) is a Jamaican triple jumper. His personal best jump is 16.47 metres (indoor), achieved in March 2006 in Boston. He also has 8.13 metres in the long jump, achieved in May 2006 in Emporia.

He finished twelfth at the 2004 World Junior Championships, won the bronze medal at the 2006 Central American and Caribbean Games and finished eighth at the 2006 Commonwealth Games. He recently achieved a new mark of 16.76 in the men's triple jump at the Jamaica national trials in June of this year, he went on to the cac games where he finished fourth with a leap of 16.65 meters.

Achievements

References

1985 births
Living people
Jamaican male triple jumpers
Athletes (track and field) at the 2006 Commonwealth Games
Athletes (track and field) at the 2010 Commonwealth Games
Central American and Caribbean Games bronze medalists for Jamaica
Competitors at the 2006 Central American and Caribbean Games
Competitors at the 2010 Central American and Caribbean Games
Central American and Caribbean Games medalists in athletics
Commonwealth Games competitors for Jamaica
20th-century Jamaican people
21st-century Jamaican people